Robert S Pirie (8 May 1934 – 15 January 2015) was an American lawyer.

Pirie was born in Chicago. He attended Buckley School in New York City and Hotchkiss School in Connecticut. He graduated from Harvard College and Harvard Law School. As an undergraduate he was attracted to bibliographical work in Elizabethan authors and began to collect actively in the late 1950s while a lieutenant in the United States Army stationed in Germany.

During the 1960s and early 1970s Pirie was associated with law firms in Boston. His work for the Harold Hughes election campaign during this time landed him on the master list of Nixon political opponents.

He later practiced in New York City and then served in turn as Co-Chairman and CEO of Rothschild, North America, Senior Managing Director of Bear Stearns & Co., and Vice-Chairman of Investment Banking at SG Cowen Securities Corporation. He died at the age of 80 in New York City in January 2015.

Pirie's extensive collection of rare books and manuscripts was auctioned by Sotheby's on December 2–4, 2015.

References

Robert S Pirie Finding Aid at the Grolier Club
Sam Roberts: ″Robert Pirie, Corporate Lawyer, Dies at 80.″ Obituary in The New York Times, 28 January 2015

External links
Property From The collection of Robert S Pirie Volumes I & II: Books and Manuscripts. Lots and auction results from Sotheby's

1934 births
2015 deaths
American book and manuscript collectors
Buckley School (New York City) alumni
Harvard College alumni
Harvard Law School alumni
Hotchkiss School alumni
New York (state) lawyers
People from Chicago
United States Army officers
N M Rothschild & Sons people